George Robert Farmer (born October 4, 1938) is a retired American luger. He competed in singles at the 1964 Winter Olympics and placed 29th. Farmer graduated from West Seattle High School and the University of Washington. At the 1964 Olympics, Farmer, Bill Marolt and Mike Hessel, were arrested for allegedly stealing a car and fighting with police, but were later acquitted.

References

1938 births
Living people
American male lugers
Lugers at the 1964 Winter Olympics
Sportspeople from Tacoma, Washington
University of Washington alumni
Olympic lugers of the United States